First Philippine Industrial Park, established in 1996, comprises 349 hectares located in the cities of Tanauan and Santo Tomas in the province of Batangas, Philippines. It currently has 67 occupants, including 37 Japanese firms and approximately 30,000 employees on site. Exports in 2011 amounted to $1.41 billion, according to the company’s latest data. The project is a joint venture between Sumitomo Corporation and First Philippine Holdings Corporation.

On February 23, 2013, Sumitomo Corporation, has begun expansion work at the First Philippine Industrial Park in Batangas, to add approximately 100 hectares of property for leasing and allow for additional factories to be constructed upon completion.

References

External links
First Philippine Industrial Park
Sumitomo Corporation HQ

1996 establishments in the Philippines
Industrial parks in the Philippines
Buildings and structures in Batangas
Santo Tomas, Batangas